Stanimir Todorov (born 14 May 1982, in Smolyan) is a Bulgarian pair skater. He competed with Rumiana Spassova. They are three-time Bulgarian national champions and placed 19th at the 2006 Winter Olympics, becoming the first Bulgarian pair skaters to compete at the Olympics.

Programs 
(with Spasova)

Results 
(with Spasova)

References

External links
 
 Pairs on Ice: Rumiana Spassova / Stanimir Todorov

1982 births
Living people
Bulgarian pair skaters
Olympic figure skaters of Bulgaria
Figure skaters at the 2006 Winter Olympics
People from Smolyan